Aksuat (Aqsuat) is a selo in Tarbagatay District, East Kazakhstan Region, Kazakhstan. It is the administrative center of the district. Population:

Toponymy
The name Aksuat derives from two Kazakh words: ақ (aq) "white" and суат (sýat) "pond".

History

Climate
Very continental. Winter is cold (in January average temperature – 22°С, – 30°С) and summer is hot (in July average temperature + 25°С, + 35°С). Very poor precipitation (200 – 300 mm/year) mostly in the winter season.

Demographics

Economy

Sights

References

External links
Akim of Tarbagatay District
www.geonames.de Subdivisions of Kazakhstan in local languages

Populated places in East Kazakhstan Region